Propylene chlorohydrin usually refers to the organic compound with the formula CH3CH(OH)CH2Cl. A related compound, an isomer, is CH3CH(Cl)CH2OH. Both isomers are colorless liquids that are soluble in organic solvents. They are classified as chlorohydrins. Both are generated on a large scale as intermediates in the production of propylene oxide.

The reaction of aqueous solution of chlorine with propene gives a 10:1 ratio of CH3CH(OH)CH2Cl and CH3CH(Cl)CH2OH. These compounds are treated with lime to give propylene oxide, which is useful in the production of plastics and other polymers.

References

Organochlorides
Commodity chemicals